Christa Schleper is a German microbiologist known for her work on the evolution and ecology of Archaea. Schleper is Head of the Department of Functional and Evolutionary Biology at the University of Vienna in Austria.

Life and education 
Schleper received a Ph.D. at the Max Planck Institute of Biochemistry in 1995 and subsequently did postdoctoral research at the Monterey Bay Aquarium Research Institute.

Work and discoveries 

Schleper is known for research advancing understanding of uncultivated Archaea in marine and terrestrial systems. Schleper's early research on Sulfolobus was the first research to indicate the presence of a virus in a thermophilic Archaea. Schleper went on to isolate multiple thermophilic Archaea capable of growth under acidic conditions, and led 16S RNA surveys to define the distribution of crenarchaeota in terrestrial environments. During postdoctoral research, Schleper used biochemical information from a low-temperature crenarchaeota to propose a non-thermophilic origin for these crenarchaeota, a novel idea at the time it was proposed in 1997. Schleper's more recent research has advanced understanding of ammonia-oxidizing thaumarchaeota. The research into ammonia-oxidizing archaea used the newly-isolated Nitrososphaera viennensis EN76 to provide the first description of the genes and proteins shared by terrestrial and marine ammonia-oxidizing archaea. Schleper's research on Lokiarchaeota provides a platform to examine the evolution of life from single celled organisms into complex, multicellular organisms.

Schleper has three patents filed in the United States: (1) Isolation and cloning of DNA from uncultivated organisms , (2) Archaeon expression system , and (3) Nucleic acids and proteins from Cenarchaeum symbiosum

Awards and recognition 

 2001 EMBO Young Investigator Award
 2011 Elected member of the American Academy of Microbiology
 2017 Elected full member of the Austrian Academy of Sciences
 2022 Wittgenstein Award

References

External links

German microbiologists
Academic staff of the University of Vienna
Fellows of the American Academy of Microbiology
1962 births
Living people
People from Oberhausen
German expatriates in Austria
21st-century women scientists
Members of the Austrian Academy of Sciences
Scientists from North Rhine-Westphalia
Women microbiologists
21st-century German scientists
German women biologists
21st-century German women